The Ashoka Chakra (alternative spelling: Ashok Chakra) is India's highest peacetime military decoration awarded for valor, courageous action, or self-sacrifice away from the battlefield. It is the peacetime equivalent of the Param Vir Chakra (PVC) and is awarded for the "most conspicuous bravery or some daring or pre-eminent valour or self-sacrifice" other than in the face of the enemy. The decoration may be awarded either to military or civilian personnel.

Havildar Bachittar Singh and Naik Narbahadur Thapa were the first recipients of the Ashoka Chakra. Subsequent awards of the Ashoka Chakra are recognized by a bar to the medal ribbon. A recipient can be awarded the Kirti Chakra or Shaurya Chakra in addition to separate acts of gallantry.

History 

The medal was originally established on 4 January 1952 as the "Ashoka Chakra, Class I" as the first step of a three-class sequence of non-combatant bravery decorations. In 1967, these decorations were removed from the "class-based" system and renamed as the Ashoka Chakra, Kirti Chakra, and Shaurya Chakra. This is an important point in understanding the independent Indian view of decorations. It would also lead to changes in the Padma Vibhushan series, the distinguished service medal series, the life-saving medal series, and the Defence Security Corps medal series.

From 1 February 1999, the central government instituted a monthly stipend for Ashoka Chakra recipients of Rs. 1400. Jammu and Kashmir awarded a cash award of Rs. 1500 for recipients of this award.

Overview 

Obverse: Circular gold gilt, 1-3/8 inches in diameter. In the center, the chakra (wheel) of Ashoka, is surrounded by a lotus wreath with an ornate edge. Suspended by a straight bar suspender. The medal is named on the edge.

Reverse: Blank in the center, with "Ashoka Chakra" in Hindi along the upper edge on the medal and the same name in English along the lower rim. On either side is a lotus design. The center is blank, perhaps with the intent that details of the award be engraved there. There is no indication of the class on the pre-1967 awards, and, in fact, there is no difference between these medals & the post-1967 awards.

Ribbon: 32 mm, dark green with a 2 mm central saffron stripe.

Ashoka Chakra recipients 
, the medal has been awarded to 86 awardees, of which 68 were to posthumous recipients.

Ashoka Chakra recipients by year and service

Superlatives

 Havildar Bachittar Singh, Naik Narbahadur Thapa, were the first recipients of the Ashoka Chakra.
Shri Amrat Lal Mehra was first youngest recipient of Ashoka Chakra from Madhya Pradesh
 Flight Lieutenant Suhas Biswas was the first recipient of the Ashoka Chakra from Indian Air Force.
 Paratrooper Sanjog Chhetri (aged 20 when posthumously awarded) was the youngest recipient of the Ashoka Chakra.
 Colonel Neelakantan Jayachandran Nair was awarded both Ashoka Chakra and Kirti Chakra.
 Damodar Kashinath Jatar, a pilot who was the first civilian recipient of the Ashoka Chakra.
 Colonel Yury Malyshev and Flight Engineer Gennadi Strekalov from Russia were the first foreign recipients of the Ashoka Chakra. (both were astronauts)
 Wing Commander Rakesh Sharma is the first Indian astronaut to be awarded the Ashoka Chakra.
 Neerja Bhanot, a flight attendant of PAN AM who was the first female recipient of the Ashoka Chakra.
 Kamlesh Kumari, a constable of CRPF who was the first recipient of the Ashoka Chakra from Central Armed Police Forces.
 Bhure Lal, a constable from Madhya Pradesh Police who is the first state policeman to be awarded the Ashoka Chakra. (Note that Shankar Lal Shrivastava, a retired head constable from Madhya Pradesh Police was posthumously awarded the Ashoka Chakra in 1967.)
 Lt. Col. Harsh Uday Singh Gaur,10 Bihar Regiment. On November 29, 1994. https://www.mynation.com/news/saluting-lt-col-harsh-uday-singh-gaur-ashok-chakra-posthumous--pj04mf

References

External links 
 Ashoka Chakra at Indian Army website
 Bharat Rakshak Page on Ashoka Chakra
 Ashoka Chakra awardees of the Indian Air Force
 Recipients of Ashoka Chakra Award

Civil awards and decorations of India
Military awards and decorations of India

Memorials to Ashoka
Ashoka Chakra
Courage awards